Bithyniella is a genus of beetles belonging to the family Leiodidae.

Species:

Bithyniella strinatii 
Bithyniella viti

References

Leiodidae